"Castellorizon" is the opening track on David Gilmour's third solo album, On an Island. It is an instrumental guitar solo, which starts off with an overture of various sounds from other tracks of the album before the guitar is introduced. The song is based on a night Gilmour spent on the Greek island of Kastellorizo. It segues into "On an Island", the title track. The song received a nomination for Best Rock Instrumental Performance at the 49th Grammy Awards. The song was nominated for the same Grammy Award again at the 51st Grammy Awards for a performance from Gilmour's Live in Gdańsk album.

References

2006 songs
Rock instrumentals
Songs written by David Gilmour
David Gilmour songs
Song recordings produced by David Gilmour
Song recordings produced by Chris Thomas (record producer)